God Is Good is the fourth studio album by stoner metal band Om. It was released in 2009 on Drag City. The album was recorded at Electrical Audio by Steve Albini and is the first studio album by Om to feature new drummer Emil Amos.

Track listing

Personnel
Om
Emil Amos – drums, percussion
Al Cisneros – bass guitar, vocals

Additional musicians
Robert Aiki Aubrey Lowe – tambura, vocals
Lorraine Rath – flute
Jackie Perez Gratz - cello

References

2009 albums
Om (band) albums
Drag City (record label) albums
Albums produced by Steve Albini